Akcami is a small village in Bozyazı district of Mersin Province, Turkey. It is situated to the northwest of Bozyazı. . The population of the village was 50. as of 2012.

References

Villages in Bozyazı District